Money marriage refers to a marriage where a girl, usually, is married off to a man to settle debts owed by her parents. The female is referred as a money wife. Money marriage is known to be a practice in Becheve, in southern Nigeria in Cross River State, where girls as young as three get married in such a way.

The tradition is said still be practiced despite being illegal in Nigeria.

References

 Money Marriage A documentary by Emeka Chkwuleta, Produced by Schucks media , 2019. 
  Money Wives, The children sold to repay debts bbc news Africa. 
 This bizarre tradition lets women get sold into marriage to pay off debts | Thepulse.ng

Types of marriage
Forced marriage